Bogumil Pawlowski (born 1898, died 1971) was a Polish botanist, a member of the Polish Academy of Sciences, professor at the Jagiellonian University, and director of the Institute of Botany of the Academy of Sciences in Kraków.

His interests included plant taxonomy, floristics, phytogeography, and phytosociology.

He was the author or co-author of over 100 papers in the field of botany, such as Flora Polska (with Władysław Szafer and Stanisław Kulczyński) describing Polish vegetation. He was also the regional adviser for Poland on the Flora Europaea project.

References

Sources 

WorldCat entry

Members of the Polish Academy of Sciences
20th-century Polish botanists
Academic staff of Jagiellonian University
1898 births
1971 deaths